Auchmeddan Castle was a castle, most likely dating from the 16th century, now demolished, located  west of Fraserburgh, at Mains of Auchmeddan, Aberdeenshire, Scotland.

The alternative name was Auchmedden castle.

History
The property belonged to the Baird family from 1568, but it was acquired by the Earls of Aberdeen, Gordons, in the mid 18th century.  The castle's demolition took place in the late 18th century. The estate returned to Bairds, though of another family, in 1858.

Up to 1913 part of the south wall, and some scattered stone, could be traced; but by 1965 there was no trace and the site was under cultivation. It is believed that some of the material from the demolition was used in the construction of Denburn House in New Pitsligo, in particular panelling and timber work.

Structure
The structure was on the side of a ravine, leading to the village of Pennan.

Tradition
Thomas the Rhymer supposedly prophesied that "there shall be an eagle in the craig while there is a Bird in Auchmeddan", and when the Bairds left the property a pair of eagles which nested on a crag near the castle are supposed to have left too.

References

Castles in Aberdeenshire